This is a list of the number-one hits of 1993 on Italian Hit Parade Singles Chart.

References

1993
One
1993 record charts